Madame Medora Henson, in later life known as Mrs Waddington Cooke (1881-1928) was an American-English soprano singer.

Life
Medora Henson was born in Virginia, the daughter of an American clergyman and a Welshwoman. She started her musical career as a pianist. George Henschel heard her sing while he conducted a musical society performance in Chicago which she was accompanying, and advised her to train her voice. Henson studied singing with Henschel and George Sweet in the United States, and continued lessons with Alberto Randegger in London, as well as in Italy, Germany and France. Returning to America, she became a leading oratorio singer.

In 1891 Henson moved to England, and her voice impressed Arthur Sullivan. She sang the part of Lady Rowena in Sullivan's opera Ivanhoe, alternating with Esther Palliser. She subsequently left the stage, and concentrated on oratorio. In 1893 she married the pianist Waddington Cooke (1868-1940).

Medora Henson sang oratorio for the Royal Choral Society and the Bach Festival. She created the soprano part in Edward Elgar's Caractacus, singing it at the Leeds, Gloucester and Sheffield Festivals. In 1898 she toured with Edvard Grieg, singing his songs. When she retired from public performances, she taught privately and at the Royal College of Music and the Guildhall School of Music.

In Christmas 1927 Henson had a serious fall in which she dislocated her left shoulder. She died on 14 April 1928 at her flat in Bedford Court Mansions in London.

References

1861 births
1928 deaths
People from Virginia
American operatic sopranos
20th-century British women opera singers
British sopranos
American emigrants to the United Kingdom